The Twisting Rook (ひねり飛車 hineribisha) opening strategy is characterized by first playing a Static Rook opening, which then switches to a Ranging Rook strategy with the rook positioned in front of one's camp.

Twisting Rook is related to the Rook On Pawn opening (縦歩取り tate fudori), which often transitions into Twisting Rook.

One possible aim of Twisting Rook is to achieve an offensive structure similar to the attacking formation used in an Ishida opening.

See also

 Rook on Pawn
 Ranging Rook
 Static Rook

Bibliography

External links

 ひねり飛車☆HACKS！ 

Shogi openings
Ranging Rook openings
Static Rook openings
Double Wing Attack openings